Angela Tessinari is an American television director.

Positions held
All My Children
Director: 1997-2008, 2008-2011

As the World Turns
Director: 2008

The City
Director: 1995 - 1997

The Guiding Light 
Associate Director: 1989

Loving
Associate Director: 19**

The Young and the Restless
Director: January 16, 2012-

Days of Our Lives
Director: 2015-

Awards and nominations
Tessinari has been nominated for nine Daytime Emmy awards in the category Outstanding Drama Series Directing Team, for her work on The Guiding Light and All My Children. She was nominated from 1990 to 2008, and won once in 2003. Her first DE nomination was shared with Bruce S. Barry, Scott McKinsey, JoAnne Sedwick, Susan Dansby, Joanne Goodhart, and John O'Connell, while her win was shared with Conal O'Brien, Robert Scinto, James A. Baffico, Casey Childs, Barbara M. Simmons, Shirley Simmons, Karen Johnson, Terry Walker, A.J. Gundell, Jerry Pilato, Penny Bergman, Rusty Swope, and Tamara P. Grady.

She was also nominated for two Directors Guild of America awards in the category Outstanding Directorial Achievement in Daytime Serials, for her work on AMC. She was nominated in 2002 and 2004.

External links
 

American television directors
Emmy Award winners
American women television directors
Living people
Place of birth missing (living people)
Year of birth missing (living people)